was a retainer beneath the clan of Asakura throughout the late Sengoku period of Feudal Japan. He was also known as Katsurada Nagatoshi (桂田 長俊).
He held fortress of Kanegasaki in Siege of Kanegasaki (1570) against Oda Nobunaga.

Samurai
1541 births
1574 deaths